Echo Canyon State Park is a public recreation area located about  east of the town of Pioche, Nevada, United States. The state park surrounds the  Echo Canyon Reservoir. The scenic area around Echo Canyon has several ranches and farms.

History
The reservoir was created with the building in 1969–70 of the Echo Canyon Dam in the Meadow Valley Wash approximately ten miles downstream from Eagle Valley Reservoir. It is also a historical site along the Mormon trail. Following development of a camping area, the Nevada Division of State Parks took control of operations in 1970.

Activities and amenities
The park offers campsites, picnicking, boat launch, and fishing. The  Ash Canyon hiking trail leads into backcountry areas of the park.

References

External links

Echo Canyon State Park Nevada State Parks

State parks of Nevada
Protected areas of Lincoln County, Nevada
Protected areas established in 1970
1970 establishments in Nevada
Reservoirs in Nevada